Alireza Alizadeh ( born 11 February 1993) is an Iranian footballer who plays as a midfielder for Iranian club Gol Gohar Sirjan.

Club career

Saipa
Alizadeh began his career with Saipa, starting in the academy. In November 2013, he was promoted to the first team by head coach Engin Firat. Alizadeh made his debut for the club against Saba Qom in the final fixture of the 2013–14 season, entering as a substitute.

International career
Alizadeh was invited to an Iran U23 preliminary camp by Nelo Vingada.

Career statistics

References

External links
 Alireza Alizadeh at PersianLeague.com

1993 births
Living people
Iranian footballers
Sportspeople from Tehran
Association football midfielders
Saipa F.C. players
Shahrdari Ardabil players
Sanat Mes Kerman F.C. players
Naft Masjed Soleyman F.C. players
Persian Gulf Pro League players
Azadegan League players